The Battle of Cape Santa Maria was a naval engagement that took place off the southern Portuguese coast, in which a British squadron under the command of Commodore Graham Moore attacked and defeated a Spanish squadron commanded by Brigadier Don José de Bustamante y Guerra.

Background
Under the terms of a secret convention Spain had to pay 72 million francs annually to France until it declared war on Britain. The British had learned of the treaty, and knew it was likely that Spain would declare war soon after the arrival of the treasure ships. Since the British also knew that by law the fleet could only land at Cádiz, as well as its place and approximate time of departure from South America, it was not difficult to position a squadron to intercept it.

Bustamante had set sail from Montevideo on 9 August 1804 with four frigates loaded with gold and silver, as well as much other valuable cargo. On 22 September Admiral Cornwallis ordered Captain Graham Moore, commanding the 44-gun razee frigate , to intercept and detain the Spanish ships, peacefully, if possible.

In line abreast they patrolled the approaches to Cádiz.

Battle

At dawn on 5 October, the Spanish frigates sighted the coast of Portugal. At 7 a.m. they sighted the four British frigates. Bustamante ordered his ships into line of battle, and within an hour the British came up in line, to windward of the Spaniards and "within pistol-shot".

Moore, the British Commodore, sent Lieutenant Ascott to the Spanish flagship Medea, to explain his orders. Bustamante naturally refused to surrender and, impatient of delays, at 10 a.m. Moore ordered a shot be fired ahead over the bows of Medea. Almost immediately a general exchange of fire broke out. Within ten minutes the magazine of the Mercedes exploded destroying the ship, and killing all but 40 of her 240 crew, including almost the entire family of the future Supreme Director of the United Provinces of the Río de la Plata, Carlos María de Alvear, who (being 16 years old at the time) witnessed the explosion alongside his father from the Medea. Within half an hour the Santa Clara and the Medea had surrendered. Fama broke away and tried to flee; Medusa quickly followed. Moore ordered the faster Lively to pursue, capturing Fama a few hours later. The three frigates were taken to Gibraltar, and then to Gosport, England.

Aftermath

In practical terms, the British interception of the four Real Armada frigates represented the end of an era for Bourbon Spain and regular specie shipments from the Spanish Empire's New World mines and mints. The squadron to which Mercedes belonged was the last of its kind that the world would see: a Spanish treasure fleet moving bullion from the New World Viceroyalties to the Iberian kingdoms.

Under the terms of the Cruizers and Convoys Act of 1708 ships captured at sea were "Droits of the Crown" and became the property of their captors, who received the full value of the ships and cargo in prize money. However, since technically Britain and Spain were not at war at the time of the action, the Admiralty Court ruled that the three ships were "Droits of the Admiralty", and all revenues would revert to them. The four Spanish ships carried a total of 4,286,508 Spanish dollars in silver and gold coin, as well as 150,000 gold ingots, 75 sacks of wool, 1,666 bars of tin, 571 pigs of copper, seal skins and oil, although 1.2 million in silver, half the copper and a quarter of the tin went down with the Mercedes. Still, the remaining ships and cargo were assessed at a value of £900,000 (equivalent to £ in ). After much legal argument an ex gratia payment was made amounting to £160,000, of which the four Captains would have received £15,000 each (equivalent to £ in ).

Spain declared war on Great Britain on 14 December 1804, but suffered a catastrophic defeat less than a year later at the Battle of Trafalgar in October 1805. Napoleon, having crowned himself Emperor on 2 December, gained Spain as an ally in his war against Britain.

Legacy

In March 2007 the Florida-based company Odyssey Marine Exploration recovered 17 tons of gold and silver from the Mercedes, insisting that it had been found in international waters and therefore beyond the legal jurisdiction of any one country. The Spanish government branded the Odyssey team "21st century pirates" and in May 2007 launched legal proceedings arguing that the wreck was protected by "sovereign immunity" which prohibits the unauthorized disturbance or commercial exploitation of state-owned naval vessels. In June 2009 the Federal Court in Tampa found against Odyssey and ordered the treasure to be returned to Spain as has been done on 25 February 2012.

Order of battle

Spain
 Medea 40 gun frigate, Flagship carrying Admiral Bustamante, commanded by Capitán Francisco de Piedrola y Verdugo
 Fama 34 gun frigate, Capitán Miguel Zapiain y Valladares
 Mercedes 36 gun frigate, Capitán Jose Manuel De Goicoa y Labart
 Santa Clara 34 gun frigate, Capitán Aleson y Bueno

Britain
  44 gun frigate, Flagship, Commodore Graham Moore
  38 gun frigate, Captain Graham Eden Hamond
  32 gun frigate, Captain Samuel Sutton
  32 gun frigate, Captain John Gore

In popular fiction 
 The action is portrayed in C. S. Forester's Hornblower and the Hotspur in which his hero Horatio Hornblower is attached to the squadron, but misses out on the captures while fending off a French ship.
 In Patrick O'Brian's novel Post Captain, Stephen Maturin provides the intelligence permitting the interception, and Captain Aubrey, in temporary command of the Lively, captures the Santa Clara and the Fama.
 In Showell Styles's Midshipman Quinn and Denise the Spy the hero, Septimus Quinn, participates in the battle (which is brought about when Denise de St-Aulaye brings documents to William Pitt and Admiral John Jervis, who organize the battle fleet) concerning the aid given France by Spain.
 A fictionalised comic book version of the recovery of the treasure, The Treasure of the Black Swan, written by a Spanish diplomat involved in the legal battle, Guillermo Corral, and Spanish graphic novelist Paco Roca was produced in 2018.

References

External links 
 Seizing the Gold of Spain
 Account of the action
 HMS Lively
 HMS Indefatigable

1804
1804
1804
Conflicts in 1804
October 1804 events